Ashburnham is a surname, and may refer to:

 Bertram Ashburnham, 4th Earl of Ashburnham (1797–1878), British peer
 Bertram Ashburnham, 5th Earl of Ashburnham (1840–1913), British peer
 Charlotte Ashburnham, Countess of Ashburnham (1776–1862), formerly Lady Charlotte Percy
 Cromer Ashburnham (1831–1917), British Army officer
 Denny Ashburnham (c.1628–1697), English landowner and politician
 George Ashburnham, 3rd Earl of Ashburnham (1760–1830), British peer
 George Ashburnham, Viscount St Asaph (1785–1813), British politician
 John Ashburnham (MP for Winchelsea) English politician
 John Ashburnham (Royalist) (1603–1671), English courtier, diplomat and politician 
 John Ashburnham, 1st Baron Ashburnham (1656–1710), English landowner and politician
 John Ashburnham, 2nd Earl of Ashburnham (1724–1812), British peer and courtier
 Thomas Ashburnham (MP) (by 1462–1523), English politician
 Thomas Ashburnham (1816–1872), Commander of British Troops in China and Hong Kong
 Thomas Ashburnham, 6th Earl of Ashburnham (1855–1924), British peer
 William Ashburnham (Royalist) (c.1604–1679) was an English army officer and MP
 William Ashburnham, 2nd Baron Ashburnham (1679–1710), English landowner and politician
 Sir William Ashburnham, 2nd Baronet (1678–1755), British politician
 Sir William Ashburnham, 4th Baronet (1710–1797), Church of England priest
 Sir William Ashburnham, 5th Baronet (1739–1823), British politician